Denmark is scheduled to compete at the 2024 Summer Olympics in Paris from 26 July to 11 August 2024. Danish athletes have appeared in every edition of the Summer Olympic Games except for the sparsely attended St. Louis 1904.

Competitors
The following is the list of number of competitors in the Games.

Athletics

Danish track and field athletes achieved the entry standards for Paris 2024, either by passing the direct qualifying mark (or time for track and road races) or by world ranking, in the following events (a maximum of 3 athletes each):

Track and road events

Equestrian

Denmark fielded a squad of three equestrian riders into the team dressage competition by winning the gold medal in the team event at the 2022 FEI World Championships in Herning.

Dressage

Qualification Legend: Q = Qualified for the final based on position in group; q = Qualified for the final based on overall position

Handball

Summary

Men's tournament

Denmark men's national handball team qualified for the Olympics by advancing to the final match against the host nation France and securing an outright berth at the 2023 IHF World Championships in Stockholm, Sweden.

Team roster
 Men's team event – 1 team of 14 players

Shooting

Danish shooters achieved quota places for the following events based on their results at the 2022 and 2023 ISSF World Championships, 2022, 2023, and 2024 European Championships, 2023 European Games, and 2024 ISSF World Olympic Qualification Tournament, if they obtained a minimum qualifying score (MQS) from 14 August 2022 to 9 June 2024.

See also
Denmark at the 2024 Summer Paralympics

References

Nations at the 2024 Summer Olympics
2024
2024 in Danish sport